Gautham Nagar is a locality and a ward in Malkajgiri suburb of Hyderabad city. It falls under Malkajgiri mandal of Medchal-Malkajgiri district of Indian State of Telangana. It is administered as Ward No. 141 of Greater Hyderabad Municipal Corporation.

Transportation
Gautham Nagar is well connected by TSRTC city bus services with Secunderabad. Nearest railway station is Malkajgiri railway station and nearest metro is Mettuguda metro station.

References 

 

Neighbourhoods in Hyderabad, India
Municipal wards of Hyderabad, India